The 1994 NFL season was the 75th regular season of the National Football League (NFL). To honor the NFL's 75th season, a special anniversary logo was designed and each player wore a patch on their jerseys with this logo throughout the season. Also, a selection committee of media and league personnel named a special NFL 75th Anniversary All-Time Team, honoring the best NFL players from the first 75 seasons.

The Phoenix Cardinals changed their name to Arizona Cardinals in an attempt to widen their appeal to the entire state of Arizona instead of just the Phoenix area. The name was initially resisted by team owner Bill Bidwill.

This marked the last season until 2016 that the city of Los Angeles had an NFL team and the last one until 2017 that the city had two. Both the Rams and the Raiders left the city following the season. The Rams moved east to St. Louis, Missouri after being in Los Angeles for 49 years, while the Raiders left after twelve seasons to return to their previous home in Oakland, California. The Rams eventually returned in 2016 after failing to reach an agreement with St. Louis on a new stadium followed by the Chargers in 2017 due to a stadium proposal being voted down by most voters in San Diego.

The season ended with Super Bowl XXIX when San Francisco defeated San Diego 49–26 at Joe Robbie Stadium. This was the first season of the 1990s to not feature the Buffalo Bills in the Super Bowl.

This was also the first time in which Christmas Day fell on a Sunday during the regular season.  The league established the practice to move most of that weekend's games to the Saturday afternoon of Christmas Eve. Every NFL season afterwards with Christmas Day on a Sunday has followed this same scheduling format. Prior to the 1990 introduction of the bye week, Christmas had fallen within the postseason. In years in which Christmas was on a Sunday, that weekend's games would be split between Saturday, December 24 and Monday, December 26.

The NFL's salary cap was implemented this season.

Player movement

Transactions
July 21: San Francisco signed quarterback Bill Musgrave
July 21: Indianapolis signed quarterback Don Majkowski
July 22: Washington signed safety Martin Bayless
July 22: The New York Giants re-signed sign punter Mike Horan
July 22: The Los Angeles Rams signed running back Johnny Bailey
July 23: Philadelphia signed Defensive End Greg Townsend
July 23  The Los Angeles Raiders signed Tackle Robert Jenkins
July 25: Indianapolis signed linebacker Scott Radecic
July 25: Miami signed guard Houston Hoover.
July 25: Green Bay signed guard Guy McIntyre.
July 25: Kansas City signed wide receiver Sanjay Beach.
July 25: Buffalo signed free safety Mike Dumas
July 25: San Francisco signed Wide Receiver Ed McCaffrey
July 26: Detroit signed Tight End Rodney Holman
July 27 Green Bay signed safety Mike Prior
July 30: Arizona signed safety Andre Waters
July 30: San Francisco signed running back Marc Logan
August 31: Minnesota  signed punter Mike Saxon.

Trades
April 14, 1994: Houston traded quarterback Warren Moon to Minnesota.
April 24, 1994: Minnesota traded defensive end Chris Doleman as a part of a package involving draft picks to Atlanta.
July 12, 1994: Detroit traded safety William White to Kansas City.

Retirements
January 15: Linebacker Lawrence Taylor announced his retirement.  Taylor was a 10-time Pro-Bowler, 10-time All-Pro (eight first-team, two second-team), two time Super Bowl champion (XXI, XXV), 1981 Defensive Rookie of the Year, three time Defensive Player of the Year (1981, 1982, 1986), and 1986 NFL MVP.  Taylor played for the New York Giants his entire 13-year career.

Draft
The 1994 NFL Draft was held from April 24 to 25, 1994. With the first pick, the Cincinnati Bengals selected defensive tackle Dan Wilkinson from Ohio State.

Major rule changes
A package of changes were adopted to increase offensive production and scoring:
The two-point conversion after touchdowns is adopted. However, the defensive two-point conversion would not be adopted until the  season; instead a two-point conversion automatically was blown dead and ruled as "no good" as soon as the defense gained possession of the ball. 
The spot of the kickoff is moved from the 35-yard line to the 30-yard line; this rule change was reverted prior to the  season.
The "neutral zone infraction" foul is adopted. A play is automatically dead before the snap when a defensive player enters the neutral zone and causes an offensive player to react.
After a field goal is missed, the defensive team takes possession of the ball at the spot of the kick (instead of at the line of scrimmage) or the 20-yard line, whichever is farther from the goal line.
During field goal attempts and extra point tries, players on the receiving team cannot block below the waist.
The referee shall announce the end of each quarter on his microphone. Prior to 1994, an official (the line judge from 1965 up to 1993) fired a starter's pistol to signal the end of a period.

Preseason

American Bowl
A series of four pre-season games that were held at sites outside the United States.  On July 31, the Los Angeles Raiders defeated Denver at Estadi Olímpic in Barcelona.  On August 7, Minnesota defeated Kansas City at the Tokyo Dome in Tokyo.  On August 13, the New York Giants defeated San Diego at Olympiastadion in Berlin.  On August 15, Houston defeated Dallas at Estadio Azteca in Mexico City.

Hall of Fame Game
The Pro Football Hall of Fame Game, in which Atlanta defeated San Diego, was played on July 30 at Tom Benson Hall of Fame Stadium in Canton, Ohio, the same city where the league was founded. The 1994 Hall of Fame Class included Tony Dorsett, Bud Grant, Jimmy Johnson, Leroy Kelly, Jackie Smith and Randy White.

Regular season

Scheduling formula

Highlights of the 1994 season included:
Shula Bowl: On October 2, Don Shula's Miami Dolphins defeated his son David Shula's Cincinnati Bengals. This marked the first time in NFL history that a head coaching matchup featured father against son.
Thanksgiving: Two games were played on Thursday, November 24, featuring Buffalo at Detroit and Green Bay at Dallas, with Detroit and Dallas winning.

Final standings

Tiebreakers
Miami finished ahead of New England in the AFC East based on head-to-head sweep (2–0).
Kansas City finished ahead of L.A. Raiders in the AFC West based on head-to-head sweep (2–0).
Green Bay was the first NFC Wild Card based on best head-to-head record (3–1) vs. Detroit (2–2) and Chicago (1–3) and better conference record (8–4) than the New York Giants (6–6).
Detroit was the second NFC Wild Card based on better division record (4–4) than Chicago (3–5) and head-to-head victory over N.Y. Giants (1–0).
Chicago was the third NFC Wild Card based on better record against common opponents (4–4) than N.Y. Giants (3–5).
New Orleans finished ahead of Atlanta in the NFC West based on head-to-head sweep (2–0).

Playoffs

Statistical leaders

Team

Individual

Awards

Coaching changes

Offseason
Arizona Cardinals: Buddy Ryan replaced the fired Joe Bugel.
Atlanta Falcons: June Jones replaced the fired Jerry Glanville who became a color commentator for the NFL on Fox prior to the 1994 season.
Dallas Cowboys: Barry Switzer replaced Jimmy Johnson, who resigned in March 1994.
New York Jets: Pete Carroll replaced the fired Bruce Coslet.
Washington Redskins: Norv Turner replaced the fired Richie Petitbon.

In-season
 Houston Oilers: Jack Pardee was fired after 10 games and was replaced by Jeff Fisher.

Stadium changes
This was the final season of selected Green Bay Packers home games in Milwaukee. Recent upgrades to Lambeau Field started to make it more lucrative for the team to play full-time in Green Bay, while Milwaukee County Stadium was becoming outdated for football.

The home of the Indianapolis Colts, the Hoosier Dome, was renamed the RCA Dome after RCA acquired the naming rights

The Seattle Seahawks played their first three regular season home games at Husky Stadium because the Kingdome, the Seahawks' regular home field, was undergoing repairs for damaged tiles on its roof. The Seahawks returned to Husky for the 2000 and 2001 seasons while their new stadium was under construction.

Uniforms

Throwback uniforms and games
The league honored its 75th season by having each team wear throwback uniforms during selected games. The designs varied widely in their accuracy; many of them were not completely accurate for a number of reasons:
 Although no attempt was made to simulate obsolete leather helmets (which were phased out in the 1950s), teams simulating uniforms from the era of leather headgear (Bears, Cardinals, Lions, Packers, Redskins, Steelers) simply removed all decals and striping from their regular hard-shell helmets.
 All jerseys displayed the players' last names on the back, though this practice did not become standard until 1970.
 The Buffalo Bills and New York Jets' otherwise accurate throwbacks used different colored helmets than their historic uniforms used, being red and green, respectively, instead of white. The Dallas Cowboys wore their then-current helmets with their throwbacks. The Cowboys and the Bills would later adopt a more accurate representation of their 1960s throwbacks as their alternative uniform, while the Jets would move to a style similar to their throwbacks but with a darker shade of green and green facemasks full-time in 1998.
 In some instances the fonts and typestyles used were only approximate matches at best. The San Diego Chargers and Houston Oilers' throwbacks averted this, being completely accurate replications, including typefaces, of their first uniforms in 1960. The Chargers and the Oilers' successors, the Tennessee Titans, wore these throwbacks again for the American Football League's 50th anniversary celebration during the 2009 season.
 The Cleveland Browns were the only team to not acquire throwbacks or alter any part of the uniform they had. They passed off their all white uniforms as "1964 throwbacks" to honor the Browns 1964 NFL Championship since with the exception of white facemasks, the 1994 all white uniform were similar in design to the 1964 uniform. Many believe Art Modell did this because of the four NFL Championships (1950, 1954, 1955 and 1964) the 1964 team was the only one that Paul Brown was not the Head Coach of and having throwbacks honoring any of the other Browns Championship Teams would be acknowledging Brown, something Modell would not do because of their antagonistic relationship dating back to when Modell purchased the team.
 On-field officials working these throwback games wore flat caps similar to the ones that NFL officials wore back in the 1920s, but still had on their regular striped shirts instead of the white dress shirts worn during that era.

Some teams occasionally wore their throwbacks in additional games during the season, and the San Francisco 49ers wore them through the Super Bowl. They proved to be so popular that the New York Giants followed the lead of the Jets (who went back to their 1960s logo in 1998) and eventually returned to wearing them full-time, with very slight modifications, in 2000. After the NFL modified its rules to allow teams to wear alternate jerseys in 2002, the San Diego Chargers selected their throwbacks as their third uniforms.

Instead of wearing their throwbacks in additional games, the Dallas Cowboys celebrated their back-to-back Super Bowl titles by wearing "Double-Star" white alternative jerseys during Thanksgiving and through the playoffs. Similar to their throwbacks, they had blue sleeves and blue stars on each shoulder, but it was the modern star design with white lines and blue borders.

Wholesale team changes
 The Denver Broncos added trim to the nameplates to match the numbers on both regular jerseys: blue trim on the orange jerseys and orange trim on the white jerseys.
 The Miami Dolphins adopted a new style of numbers on their jerseys: white numbers with orange trim on their aqua jerseys and aqua numbers with orange trim on their white jerseys.
 The New England Patriots switched from red to white numbers on their blue jerseys; gray to red facemasks; and a different red-blue design on the pants stripping. 
 The Seattle Seahawks adopted a thinner font for their jersey numbers.

Television
This was the first season that the then-eight-year old Fox network televised NFL games, taking over the NFC package from CBS. ABC, NBC, TNT, and ESPN renewed their rights to televise Monday Night Football, the AFC package, Sunday night games during the first half of the season, and Sunday night games during the second half of the season, respectively. All of these networks signed four-year television contracts through the 1997 season. The league also signed an exclusivity agreement with the new direct broadcast satellite (DBS) service DirecTV to launch NFL Sunday Ticket, a satellite television subscription service offering every Sunday afternoon regular season NFL game.

Fox hired several members from CBS, including its lead broadcast team of Pat Summerall and John Madden; and Dick Stockton and Matt Millen to serve as Fox's #2 team. For the new Fox NFL Sunday pregame show, the network hired CBS play-by-play announcer James Brown to be the host, and Terry Bradshaw as the show's lead analyst in basically the same role he had on The NFL Today on CBS. The then-recently retired player Howie Long and head coach Jimmy Johnson also joined Fox NFL Sunday.

NBC fired O. J. Simpson after he was charged with murder during the off-season. The network also hired Greg Gumbel from CBS to become the new host of NFL Live!, replacing Jim Lampley. Ahmad Rashad became the show's new co-host, while Joe Gibbs joined Mike Ditka as the show's analysts.

External links
Football Outsiders 1994 DVOA Ratings and Commentary

References

NFL Record and Fact Book
NFL History 1991–2000 (Last accessed October 17, 2005)
Total Football: The Official Encyclopedia of the National Football League
NFL 75th Anniversary Throwbacks (Archived 2009-10-21)

National Football League seasons
 
National Football League
1994 in American sports